Dactylorhiza praetermissa, the southern marsh orchid or leopard marsh orchid, is a commonly occurring species of European orchid.

Description 
The flowers, appearing from May to July, are various shades of pink with variable markings. The basal lip of the flower is rounded.

This species is able to form hybrids with other Dactylorhiza species, and crosses with Dactylorhiza fuchsii occur especially often.

Distribution and habitat
It is native to northern and central Europe (Britain, Denmark, Norway, Sweden, Germany, Netherlands, Belgium, France, Estonia and Latvia). It is also reportedly naturalized in Italy and in parts of Canada (Ontario and Newfoundland).

This species is found close to water, in damp alkaline meadows, by ponds, lakes or reservoirs and in dune slacks.

Ecology

The flowers of this species are pollinated by insects including the cuckoo bee and skipper butterfly.

Dactylorhiza are known to be mycorrhizal generalists. D. praetermissa has been shown to benefit from association with fungal species in the genus Rhizoctonia and others in the Tulasnellaceae family.

Subspecies and varieties
Many names for infraspecific taxa have been proposed. At of June 2014, the following are recognized:

Dactylorhiza praetermissa var. junialis (Verm.) Senghas - Britain, France, Belgium, Netherlands, Canada 
Dactylorhiza praetermissa subsp. osiliensis (Pikner) Kreutz - Sweden, Estonia
Dactylorhiza praetermissa subsp. praetermissa - Britain, Denmark, Norway, Netherlands, Belgium, Germany, France, Italy 
Dactylorhiza praetermissa subsp. schoenophila R.M.Bateman & Denholm - Britain

References

External links

Biohorizons - An investigation to determine variation in marsh orchid (Dactylorhiza) populations at Moses Gate Country Park, Bolton
First Nature - Dactylorhiza praetermissa

praetermissa
Orchids of Europe
Plants described in 1914